Samantha Waters may refer to:

Samantha "Sam" Waters, character in Profiler (TV series)
Samantha "Sam" Waters, character in The Pretender (TV series)
Samantha "Sam" Booke Waters, character in Brothers (1984 TV series)

See also
Sam Waters (disambiguation)
Samantha Walters (disambiguation)